Kargıpınarı (former Gilindire) is a town in Mersin Province, Turkey

Geography 
It is a part of Erdemli district which in turn is a part of Mersin Province. The population is 11923 as of 2012.

Etymology and History 
The former name of the town is Gilindire. There are two theories about the origin of this name. The town shares the same name with the river at the east side of the town. The earliest reference to the river can be found in Evliya Çelebi’s Seyahatname of 1671 with the name Gelendir. According to the other theory the name began to be used as recently as 19th century. It is known that the village had been established by Oghuz Turks (Turkmens) who had migrated from Aydıncık district of Mersin in the 19th century. The Turkmens used the former name of Aydıncık (which was Kelenderis) for their new home. But later the name of a spring around the village came to be used both for the village and for the river. (Kargıpınarı )

The population of the village increased in the first half of the 20th century and Kargıpınarı was declared as a seat of township in 1969.

Economy 
The major economic activity is agriculture. Kargıpınarı is one of the most important citrus producers of Mersin Province and Mersin Province is the most important citrus producer of Turkey. Other crops such as tomatoes and cucumbers are also produced. The citrus plantation is mostly on the north of the town.

References 

Populated places in Mersin Province
Populated coastal places in Turkey
Seaside resorts in Turkey
Towns in Turkey
Populated places in Erdemli District